Wales has traditionally been divided into a number of ambiguous and undefined areas described as "regions", reflecting historical, geographical, administrative, cultural and electoral boundaries within the country. Presently, the most common form of division of Wales into "regions" has been using cardinal and intercardinal references, north or south-west for example. None of the variously described "regions" have official status or defined boundaries, there is neither a fixed number of regions. Various organisations use different regions and combinations of regions for their individual purposes. This includes devolved institutions, such as Visit Wales, Natural Resources Wales, and the Welsh Government itself, using different sets of Wales' regions. Wales is most commonly sub-divided into between two and four regions, with a North–South divide, and North, Mid, South East and South West division being common. This article will list the various terms applied to be the "regions of Wales" and the regions used by various organisations.

Status
The regions of Wales have little administrative status as of 2022, nor are officially defined, local government is primarily managed by the twenty-two principal areas.

Some argue that Wales should stop using terms to describe regions of Wales, as they lack of strict definition or boundaries, and instead consider Wales as only one. Whereas others campaign for more recognition of Wales' various regions, such as the north and west.

Historical usage

North-South divide 

There may be a north-south divide, between North Wales and South Wales in Wales. The Cambrian Mountains form a mountainous interior of Wales, limiting the connection between North and South due to insufficient transport links. Most of the population of Wales is concentrated on opposing sides of Wales. Transport links between North and South Wales are significantly weak, with major north–south links passing through England, and both the North and South, having closer transport links with North West England, and South West England respectively.  Liverpool is sometimes described as the "Capital of North Wales", as its the largest city closest to North Wales. Historical maps divide North and South Wales using the border between Montgomeryshire and Radnorshire, and Cardiganshire and Merionethshire, but the modern day divide is described to be ambiguous or arbitrary.

Modern usage 
Since devolution, the Welsh Government is making efforts to increase connection between north and south. Although in 2013, there were reports that the Welsh Government potentially shortchanged the north by £131.53 million, which critics describe to be proof of a modern north–south divide. The government responded stating the figures are "highly misleading", as it ignores funding through Wales-wide programmes, and that the government has spent more on health and transport in the north than the south-east, and more on education than the national average. Then First Minister of Wales, Carwyn Jones disagreed that there was a north–south divide in Wales, but stated that there would "never be a time" that people will no longer see a north–south divide.

There is a part-ministerial post in the Welsh Cabinet for "North Wales", and a North Wales office of the Senedd. Plaid Cymru has called for a trans-Wales railway as a solution to bridge the cultural divide between north and south.

There is a north–south divide in language, not only between more and less Welsh-speaking areas, but also in terms of accents (both relating to English and Welsh) and dialects of Welsh.

There may be a tourism divide between north and south Wales due to geographic and existing transport capabilities, with tourism in the north aimed for nearby tourists from the rest of the UK and closer airports in Liverpool and Manchester, for day trips and staycations. Whereas strategies for the south by the devolved administrations aim for more international and longer term tourism through Cardiff Airport in the south. Strategies based on drawing tourists through Cardiff Airport may not have a big impact on the north due to a lack of connectivity with Cardiff Airport and the north of Wales.

Capitalisation
There is a debate whether to spell the regions of Wales with a capitalised letter or a lowercase letter, for example either a lower case 'n' for north Wales or a capitalised 'N' for North Wales (see North Wales#Capitalisation). The debate has been coined as the "to cap or not to cap" debate in media. Usage varies, BBC News and the Welsh Government for example use lowercase, whereas Visit Wales uses capitalised, with the latter having their own version of Wales' regions.  David Williams, chairman of the North Wales Business Club, announced his support for capping the term "North" in "North Wales" stating that the region should be "very recognisable [...] in our own right".

List of regions

Geographical regions and sub-regions
Regions using the cardinal and intercardinal points of a compass, e.g. north and south-west for nomenclature, and are based mainly on physical and environmental geographic factors due to their lack of definition.

For many administrative purposes, most of the regions follow the boundaries of the twenty-two principal areas of Wales. Those listed below are based on the usage by organisations further down.

 North Wales
 North East Wales
 North West Wales
 North Central Wales (sometimes used)
 Mid Wales or Central Wales
 Mid and South West Wales
 Mid and West Wales
 South Wales
 South West Wales
 South East Wales
South Central Wales (sometimes used)
 East Wales
 West Wales
West Wales and the Valleys

By organisation 
Note: names in-between inverted commas ("), implies there are other definitions of the region that may be more common.

Visit Wales 
Visit Wales uses four regions:
 North Wales — northern six principal areas (i.e. excluding Powys)
 Mid Wales — Ceredigion and Powys
 "West Wales" — with the common definition of South West Wales
 "South Wales" — with the common definition of South East Wales

Business Wales 
Business Wales uses four regions:
 North Wales — northern six principal areas (i.e. excluding Powys)
 "Mid Wales" — Carmarthenshire, Ceredigion, Pembrokeshire and Powys
 "South East Wales" — Blaenau Gwent, Caerphilly, Cardiff, Monmouthshire, Newport, Torfaen, Vale of Glamorgan
 "South West Wales" — Bridgend, Merthyr Tydfil, Neath Port Talbot, Rhondda Cynon Taf, Swansea

Welsh Government Economic Action Plan 
Either a three economic region model or a four economic region model:

Three region model 
North Wales
Mid and South West Wales
South East Wales

Four region model 
North Wales
Mid Wales
South West Wales
South East Wales

Future Wales: The National Plan 2040 (Welsh Government) 
North (North Wales)
Mid Wales
South West (South West Wales)
South East (South East Wales)

Natural Resources Wales 
Described as the six "areas" (with an additional "marine area") by Natural Resources Wales
North East Wales  — Denbighshire, Flintshire, and Wrexham
North West Wales  — Conwy, Gwynedd and Isle of Anglesey
Mid Wales  — Ceredigion and Powys
South Central Wales  — Bridgend, the Vale of Glamorgan, Merthyr Tydfil, Rhondda Cynon Taf and Cardiff
"South East Wales" — Blaenau Gwent, Caerphilly, Monmouthshire, Newport and Torfaen
"South West Wales"  — Swansea, Neath Port Talbot, Pembrokeshire and Carmarthenshire

Wales Spatial Plan 
Note: no clear boundaries shown, merely labels on a blank map.
North West Wales
North East Wales — Border and Coast
Central Wales
South East — the Capital Network
Swansea Bay — Waterfront & Western Valleys
Pembrokeshire — The Haven

Former organisations

Welsh Development Agency and the Development Board for Rural Wales

Pre-mid-1990s regions

 "North East Wales" — Clwyd with boundaries between 1974 and 1996 
 "North West Wales" — Gwynedd with boundaries between 1974 and 1996 (excluding Meirionnydd); (Modern Isle of Anglesey,  half of Gwynedd and half of Conwy County Borough)
 Development Board for Rural Wales — Mid Wales (Powys and Ceredigion) and Meirionnydd of Gwynedd.
 "West Wales" — Pembrokeshire and Carmarthenshire (excluding Llanelli).
 South Wales (West) — Llanelli, Swansea, Neath Port Talbot and parts of Bridgend County Borough
 South Wales (Valleys) — Blaenau Gwent, Caerphilly County Borough, Merthyr Tydfil County Borough, Rhondda Cynon Taf, Torfaen, and parts of Bridgend County Borough.
 South Wales (East) — City and County of Cardiff, Newport, Monmouthshire, and the Vale of Glamorgan.

Post-mid-1990s regions

 "North Wales" — Clwyd and Gwynedd with boundaries between 1974 and 1996 (excluding Meirionnydd)
 Development Board for Rural Wales — Mid Wales (Powys and Ceredigion) and Meirionnydd of Gwynedd.
 "West Wales" — Pembrokeshire, Carmarthenshire, City and County of Swansea, Neath Port Talbot and Bridgend County Borough
 "South Wales" — Blaenau Gwent, Caerphilly County Borough, City and County of Cardiff, Merthyr Tydfil County Borough, Monmouthshire, Newport, Rhondda Cynon Taf, Torfaen, and Vale of Glamorgan

Other organisations
 Royal Society of Architects in Wales: Branches in North, Mid, West and South Wales (latter described as the "Design Circle" (RSAW South)).
 The Wildlife Trusts: Gwent, Montgomeryshire, North Wales, Radnorshire, and South and West Wales.
 For the National Forest for Wales Welsh Government programme, Wales was divided into three "areas", North, Mid, South based on the use of lettering ("N", "M", "S").

Statistical regions

StatsWales 
StatsWales divides Wales into "Economic regions", of either a three economic region model or a four economic region model:

Three region model 
North Wales
Mid and South West Wales
South East Wales

Four region model 
North Wales
Mid Wales
South West Wales
South East Wales

International Territorial Level 2 regions 

 East Wales
 West Wales and the Valleys

Cultural regions
 South Wales Valleys ("The Valleys")
 North Wales
 South Wales
 Little England beyond Wales

Denis Balsom's three-Wales model (1985)

 Welsh Wales — Areas with majority of those identifying as 'Welsh'
 British Wales — Areas with majority of those identifying as 'British'
 Y Fro Gymraeg — Areas with majority Welsh-speakers

Linguistic regions

Welsh speakers
Carmarthenshire, Ceredigion, Gwynedd and Isle of Anglesey — Majority Welsh-speaking region (>40%)
Conwy, Denbighshire, Pembrokeshire and Powys — Significant Welsh-speaking region (20-39%)
Rest of Wales — Minority Welsh-speaking region (<19%)

Dialect regions
Two dialect model:

 Northern Welsh — North Wales
 Southern Welsh — South Wales

Four dialect model:

 Gwyndodeg — North West Wales
 Powyseg — Northern Mid Wales and North East Wales
 Dyfedseg — South West Wales (includes subdialect Iaith Sir Benfro — "Pembrokeshire language")
 Gwenhwyseg — South East Wales

City regions

 North Wales Economic Ambition Board — consisting the principal areas of: Conwy County Borough, Denbighshire, Flintshire, Gwynedd, Isle of Anglesey, and Wrexham County Borough, in the north of Wales. (A common definition of North Wales).
 Growing Mid Wales Partnership — consisting the principal areas of: Ceredigion, and Powys
 Swansea Bay City Region — consisting the principal areas of: Carmarthenshire, Neath Port Talbot, Pembrokeshire, and Swansea, around Swansea Bay in south-west Wales. (Similar definition to South West Wales).
 Cardiff Capital Region — consisting the principal areas of: Blaenau Gwent, Bridgend County Borough, Caerphilly County Borough, Cardiff, Merthyr Tydfil County Borough, Monmouthshire, Newport, Rhondda Cynon Taf, Torfaen, and Vale of Glamorgan, in south-east Wales. (Similar definition to South East Wales).

Regional Tourism Partnerships
Tourism Partnership North Wales
South West Wales Tourism Partnership
Tourism Partnership Mid Wales
Capital Region Tourism
Forgotten Landscapes Project (Blaenavon)

Regional Corporate Joint Committees
North Wales
Mid Wales
South West Wales
South East Wales

Regional Skills Partnerships 

 North Wales Regional Skills Partnership
 South West and Mid Wales Regional Learning and Skills Partnership (for Swansea Bay and Mid Wales deals)
 Cardiff Capital Region Skills Partnership (South East Wales)

Transport-related
 M4 Corridor in England and Wales
 Trunk road agents:
 North and Mid Wales Trunk Road Agent
 South Wales Trunk Road Agent
 Regional Metros:
 North Wales Metro
 South Wales Metro
 Swansea Bay and West Wales Metro
 Former regional transport consortia:
 South East Wales Transport Alliance
 South West Wales Integrated Transport Consortium
 Taith Joint Board (North Wales excluding Meirionydd in Gwynedd)
 TraCC (Mid Wales including Meirionydd in Gwynedd)

Cross-border regions
 Welsh Marches
 Welsh Lost Lands
 The Mersey Dee Alliance, composed of Cheshire West and Chester, Flintshire, Wirral and Wrexham councils, describes an "economic sub-region" known as the Mersey Dee. Sometimes expanded to also include the rest of North Wales as "North Wales (and) Mersey Dee".
 Severnside
Western Gateway

Electoral regions

North Wales (Senedd electoral region) & North Wales (European Parliament constituency)
Mid and West Wales (Senedd electoral region) & Mid and West Wales (European Parliament constituency)
South Wales Central (Senedd electoral region) & South Wales Central (European Parliament constituency)
South Wales East (Senedd electoral region) & South Wales East (European Parliament constituency)
South Wales West (Senedd electoral region) & South Wales West (European Parliament constituency)

Historic regions

 Rhos region of North Wales
 Ystrad Tywi
 Meirionnydd
 Rhwng Gwy a Hafren
 Deheubarth

Natural regions
 Snowdonia
 Swansea Bay (region)

Coal mining regions
 Anglesey Coalfield
 North Wales Coalfield
 Denbighshire Coalfield
 Flintshire Coalfield
 Pembrokeshire Coalfield
 South Wales Coalfield

Fire and Rescue
Mid and West Wales Fire and Rescue Service
North Wales Fire and Rescue Service
South Wales Fire and Rescue Service

Rugby
North Wales Crusaders
South Wales Ironmen, later renamed as West Wales Raiders

Others
 Local health boards — some health boards are described to be "regional" health boards due to the size of their coverage.
 Betsi Cadwaladr University Health Board — locally described as the "North Wales health board"
 Hywel Dda University Health Board — locally described as the "West Wales health board"
South Wales Police
North Wales Police

See also
Administrative geography of the United Kingdom
Historical and alternative regions of England
International Territorial Level
Local government in Wales

References